Ukraine has participated in the Eurovision Young Dancers 3 times since its debut in 2001.

Participation overview

See also
Ukraine in the Eurovision Song Contest
Ukraine in the Eurovision Young Musicians

References

External links 
 Eurovision Young Dancers

Countries in the Eurovision Young Dancers